Opera cake is a French cake. Its namesake originates  from the layers resembling the levels of an opera house. 

Traditionally, the word Opera is also written on top of the chocolate glaze. Edible gold leaf is sometimes added to the presentation.

Origin
An advertisement in Le Gaulois in 1899 offers a "".

The cake was popularized by the French  house Dalloyau, but its origin is unclear. Cyriaque Gavillon claimed to have created the cake there in 1955 and that his wife Andrée Gavillon named it after the Opéra Garnier.

Gaston Lenôtre (1920–2009) claimed he invented the dessert in 1960.

See also
 List of French desserts
 Tiramisu

References

French desserts
Chocolate cakes
Chocolate desserts